Cedar Creek Reservoir is a large reservoir located in Franklin County, Alabama (USA) along Cedar Creek.

Cedar Creek Dam is 96-foot high earthen dam for flood control and irrigation, completed in 1979 as a project of the Tennessee Valley Authority.  No hydroelectric power is generated here.

The "cedar" in the name refers to the eastern juniper (Juniperus virginiana), mistaken by early European settlers for the Lebanon Cedar (Cedrus libani) mentioned in the Bible.

References

See also
List of Alabama dams and reservoirs

Reservoirs in Alabama
Bodies of water of Franklin County, Alabama
Dams in Alabama
Tennessee Valley Authority dams
Dams completed in 1979